The Anglican Church of St Stephen in Charlton Musgrove in the English county of Somerset was built in the 13th century. It is a Grade II* listed building.

The church was associated with Bruton Priory in the 12th century. Members of the Leir family have been rectors from 1661 until 1976. The Victorian restoration in 1884 caused conflict as the rector Charles Edward Lier has not obtained the relevant permissions from the bishop.

The stone building has slate roofs. It consists of a three bay nave and two bay chancel with a three-stage west tower which houses three bells and is decorated with hunky punks and gargoyles. Inside the church are an octagonal font dating from the 17th century and a hatchment from 1660.

The parish is part of the benefice of Charlton Musgrove, Cucklington and Stoke Trister within the Diocese of Bath and Wells.

See also  
 List of ecclesiastical parishes in the Diocese of Bath and Wells

References

Grade II* listed buildings in South Somerset
13th-century church buildings in England
Church of England church buildings in South Somerset
Grade II* listed churches in Somerset